Forest Lake Resort was a resort in the Cobb Mountain area of Lake County, California, in an area of wet meadows along Kelsey Creek.
Originally a campground, it was developed into a resort in the 1930s to exploit the growing automobile-based recreation market.
The resort was sold in 1963. 
By 1989 it was longer operational, and was being considered for development as a community park site.

Location

Forest Lake is dominated by wet meadow and waterway features.
Kelsey Creek, from Forest Lake downstream to around Glenbrook, is a federally designated flood boundary. That is, it is a floodplain that is expected to be inundated every 100 years.

Early years

Originally the Forest Lake property was the home of James Hartford Smith, who bought the land in 1868. 
His son Nate turned it into a campground, which he ran with his wife, which passed in turn to his son Will in 1900. Will Smith sold the campground to Hugh Davey.
Jim McCauley had operated a brewery in Vallejo, but Prohibition in 1920 forced him to look for new sources of revenue.
He lent money to Davey with the campground and Boggs Mountain as collateral.
Davey defaulted in 1922 and McCauley's Calso Company became the owner.

McCauley bottled "Calso Water" at the Camp Calso spring.
It was thought to help relieve hangovers, and was popular between 1924 and 1942.
In 1926 he created the Camp Calso residential subdivision as a speculation.
Many of the lots were very small, and there was no provision for water, sewer or drainage.

Resort

McCauley decided to turn the campground into a resort, originally named Camp Calso.
He put up the main building in 1930.
The resort was among the new automobile-oriented vacation resorts developed in the 1930s, others being Whispering Pines and Pine Grove.
Many of the older resorts did not make the transition to automobiles and had to close down.
McCauley dammed a branch of Kelsey Creek to create Lake McCauley in 1935.
He built cabins, and in 1937 made a swimming pool. 
Guests at the resort played a game named Calso after the bottled water. similar to Bingo.
Dance music was provided by entertainers such as Jimmy Catalano and his Band.

McCauley renamed Camp Calso to Forest Lake Resort in 1938.
He and his niece's husband Vince Emerson ran the resort successfully until 1939, when Emerson took full responsibility.
McCauley died on 26 December 1942.
His property was divided between seven nieces and nephews, one of whom was Vince Emerson's son Don, who lived near the resort in Cobb.
Husband and wife Vince and Marian Emerson ran the resort until Vince died in 1946, when the resort continued to be run by Marian and their son Don. Don in turn owned and ran it with his wife Dorothy from 1950 to 1963, creating the Hoberg's Forest Lake Golf Course in 1954.
Many family activities were available, including horseback riding.
Supervised activities were provided for children, including swimming in the pool, games, hay rides and special meal times. 
The Emersons sold the resort to Joe Breen and Vic Tamera in 1963.
Later Forest Lake became the property of Calistoga Mineral Water, a subsidiary of Nestlé.

Later developments

As of 1989  of vacant land beside the Forest Lake area was zoned for of low-density residential planned development.
Zoning allowed residential and commercial development along California State Route 175 north of the Forest Lake area to the Bottle Rock Road intersection, but half the commercial space was vacant or underutilized.
Some planned development commercial zoning applied to open space at Forest Lake on land with sensitive environmental resources adjacent to previously approved planned development.
Portions of Forest Lake were designated for resource conservation land uses.

A plan for the Cobb Mountain Area issued in 1989 discussed developing Forest Lake as a park facility.
The 1989 Cobb Mountain Area plan recommended that its recreational development be limited to low-cost passive facilities such as picnic sites, trails and walkways, and should be improved for outdoors activities such as fishing and wildlife observation.
It could be classified as a community park site. 
The Cobb Area Council held a public meeting on 18 April 2019 where it was reported that the county was still not looking at changing Forest Lake into a park, although there was local support for the idea.

Notes

Citations

Sources

Further reading 

 

Resorts in Lake County, California
History of Lake County, California